Tatau is a British drama television series that premiered on BBC Three on 12 April 2015. The programme is a supernatural murder mystery set in the Cook Islands. The series consists of 8 episodes.

Cast
 Joe Layton as Kyle Connor
 Theo Barklem-Biggs as Pete 'Budgie' Griffiths
 Barry Atsma as Dries
 Shushila Takao as Aumea Vaipiti
 Temuera Morrison as Anaru Vaipiti
 Cian Elyse White as Lara
 Alexander Tarrant as Maui Vaipiti
 Tai Berdinner-Blades as Tyler
 Kirk Torrance as Reverend Calcott
. Aruna Po-Ching as Patea Vaipiti

Critical reception
The critical reception to Tatau has been generally negative. The Philadelphia Inquirer called it "must-miss" television, a "weak show" with an "incredibly annoying hero" and The Daily Telegraph'''s Isabel Mohan called the show "grating", "tedious" and "far-fetched". Brian Lowry of Variety'' was more ambivalent, saying that it "works as a modest mystery/picturesque travelogue, provided one can get past the hackneyed premise and almost complete lack of character establishment... a mildly watchable thriller, assuming viewers don't dwell too much on the white-savior-in-exotic-locale undertones."

References

External links
 

2010s British drama television series
2015 British television series debuts
2015 British television series endings
BBC television dramas
English-language television shows
Television series by Banijay
Television series by South Pacific Pictures
Television shows filmed in the Cook Islands
Television shows set in Auckland
Television shows set in the Cook Islands